Lewis Lamont Brinson (born May 8, 1994) is an American professional baseball outfielder for the Yomiuri Giants of Nippon Professional Baseball (NPB). He has previously played in Major League Baseball (MLB) for the Milwaukee Brewers, Miami Marlins and San Francisco Giants. The Texas Rangers selected Brinson in the first round of the 2012 Major League Baseball draft.

Early life
Lewis Brinson grew up in South Florida. As a child, he aspired to play baseball for the Florida Marlins. Brinson attended Coral Springs High School in Coral Springs, Florida. In the summer before his senior year, he won a home run derby for prospects at Wrigley Field. He initially committed to play college baseball for the Florida Gators of the University of Florida.

Career

Texas Rangers

The Texas Rangers selected Brinson in the first round of the 2012 Major League Baseball draft. He signed with the Rangers, receiving a $1.625 million signing bonus, and made his professional debut with the Arizona League Rangers, hitting .283/.345/.523 with seven home runs over 237 at-bats in 54 games.

Brinson spent 2013 with the Hickory Crawdads of the Class A South Atlantic League, hitting .237/.322/.427 with 21 home runs. He started 2014 with Hickory before being promoted to the Myrtle Beach Pelicans. In 347 at-bats over 89 games, he hit .288/.354/.458 with 13 home runs. Brinson started 2015 with the High Desert Mavericks of the Class A-Advanced California League and was promoted to the Frisco RoughRiders of the Double-A Texas League and Round Rock Express of the Triple-A Pacific Coast League (PCL) during the season. In 100 games over the three levels, he hit .332/.403/.601 with 20 home runs. After the season, he played in the Arizona Fall League. Brinson was invited to spring training by the Rangers in 2016. He began the season in Frisco.

Milwaukee Brewers
On August 1, 2016, the Rangers traded Brinson, Luis Ortiz, and a player to be named later, Ryan Cordell to the Milwaukee Brewers for Jonathan Lucroy and Jeremy Jeffress. The Brewers assigned Brinson to the Colorado Springs Sky Sox of the PCL. He finished the 2016 season with a .268 batting average, 15 homers and 61 RBI's. The Brewers added him to their 40-man roster after the season.

Brinson began the 2017 season with Colorado Springs. The Brewers promoted him to the major leagues on June 10. In 21 games, Brinson hit two home runs and batted .106. In 2017 in the PCL he batted .331/.400/.562.

Miami Marlins
On January 25, 2018, the Brewers traded Brinson, Isan Díaz, Monte Harrison, and Jordan Yamamoto to the Miami Marlins for Christian Yelich. MLB.com ranked Brinson as Miami's top prospect going into the 2018 season. On March 25, 2018, the Marlins announced that Brinson had made the Opening Day roster. In 382 at bats with Miami he hit .199/.240/.338. 

He was demoted to AAA on April 30, 2019, and promoted back to the major leagues on August 5. In 2019 in the PCL he batted .270/.361/.510. 

During the pandemic-shortened 2020 MLB season, Brinson hit over .200 for the first time in his major league career, hitting .226/.268/.368 with three home runs and 12 RBIs in 47 games. Brinson additionally made his first appearance in the postseason, where he was hitless in six at-bats. 

Brinson again made the Marlins' Opening Day roster in 2021.  In August of 2021, Brinson claimed to have been called a racial slur by a fan at Coors Field.   A subsequent investigation by MLB found that the fan was trying to get the attention of the Rockies mascot, "Dinger" for his grandchildren. After saying he was "open" to that explanation, Brinson continued to insist he had been called a racial slur, and demanded that the Rockies change the mascot's name.      The Marlins designated Brinson for assignment after the 2021 season. He was non-tendered on November 30, making him a free agent.

Houston Astros
On March 12, 2022, Brinson signed a minor league contract with the Houston Astros.  Over 85 games, he batted .299/356/.574 with 22 home runs for the Triple-A Sugar Land Space Cowboys of the Pacific Coast League.

San Francisco Giants
On September 1, 2022, the Astros traded Brinson to the San Francisco Giants for an undisclosed return. On September 21, Brinson was designated for assignment after batting .167/.211/.472 in 16 games with the Giants.

Yomiuri Giants
On January 12, 2023, Brinson signed with the Yomiuri Giants of Nippon Professional Baseball (NPB).

References

External links

1994 births
Living people
Brinson, Lewis
Baseball players from Fort Lauderdale, Florida
Major League Baseball outfielders
Milwaukee Brewers players
Miami Marlins players
San Francisco Giants players
Arizona League Rangers players
Hickory Crawdads players
Myrtle Beach Pelicans players
High Desert Mavericks players
Frisco RoughRiders players
Round Rock Express players
Surprise Saguaros players
Indios de Mayagüez players
Colorado Springs Sky Sox players
New Orleans Baby Cakes players
Jacksonville Jumbo Shrimp players
Sugar Land Space Cowboys players